Eubacterium oxidoreducens is a Gram positive bacterium species in the genus Eubacterium.

1,2,3,5-Tetrahydroxybenzene is a benzenetetrol and a metabolite in the degradation of 3,4,5-trihydroxybenzoate by E. oxidoreducens.

The enzyme phloroglucinol reductase uses dihydrophloroglucinol and NADP+ to produce phloroglucinol, NADPH, and H+. It is found in E. oxidoreducens.

References

External links 

Type strain of Eubacterium oxidoreducens at BacDive -  the Bacterial Diversity Metadatabase

Eubacteriaceae
Bacteria described in 1986